The Moorefield Formation, or Moorefield Shale, is a geologic formation in northern Arkansas and eastern Oklahoma that dates to the Meramecian Series of the middle Mississippian. In Arkansas, this formation is generally recognized to have one member, the Ruddell Shale, in the upper Moorefield Formation.

Paleofauna

Bryozoans
Archimedes
A. confertus
A. proutanus
Batostomella
B. dubla
B. parvula
Tabulipora

Cephalopods
 Adnatoceras
 A. alaskense
 Bactrites
 B. caronarius
 B. smithianus
 Endolobus
 E. ornatus
 Girtyoceras
 G. welleri
 Goniaties
 Mitorthoceras

See also

 List of fossiliferous stratigraphic units in Arkansas
 Paleontology in Arkansas

References

 

Carboniferous geology of Oklahoma
Carboniferous Arkansas
Carboniferous southern paleotropical deposits